Savannah Haske (born November 18, 1977) is an American television and film actor and writer. She is perhaps best known for her role in the television series Third Watch as Tatiana Deschenko.

Filmography

References

External links 
 
 

1977 births
Living people
American television actresses
21st-century American actresses
American film actresses
Actresses from New York City